Beaverton High School (often referred to as The Beaverton High School) is a public high school located in Beaverton, Oregon, United States. The original schoolhouse, called Beaverton Public School, opened in 1875 on land between Canyon Road and Broadway Street. In 1902, a ninth grade class was added, followed by a 10th grade in 1910 and 11th grade in 1915. Voters approved a $21,000 bond issue submitted by the school board in 1915 to construct a 21-room high school building on land south of Second Street between Stott Street and Erickson Street.

On June 19, 1916, the city of Beaverton dedicated the new Beaverton High School. Construction costs totaled $20,778, according to the Beaverton Times newspaper. It is the oldest high school in Beaverton and is believed to be the oldest public high school in the state of Oregon that is in its original location and building.

History
Beaverton High School contains grades 9–12. In 1937, a new school called Beaverton Grade School was built just southeast of Beaverton High School by the Works Progress Administration. The building would be renamed Merle Davies School in 1948 to honor a longtime teacher and principal. In 1983, the Merle Davies building became a classroom annex to Beaverton High School. It was shut down in 2006 for renovation and reopened in September 2010 as additional classrooms.

The school's auditorium burned down in March 1979.

Parts of the school caught on fire on January 18, 2020. There was permanent and non-permanent damage to multiple classrooms in the main building.

Large scale reconstruction was included in a $723 million bond measure passed in May 2022.

Academics
In 1985, Beaverton High School was honored in the Blue Ribbon Schools Program, the highest honor a school can receive in the United States.

In 2008, 75% of the school's seniors received a high school diploma. Of 521 students, 390 graduated, 99 dropped out, five received a modified diploma, and 27 were still in high school in 2009.

The school has classes in Spanish, Japanese, and French languages, and elective class pathways in marketing, engineering, digital media, and health.

Notable alumni

 Anomie Belle (1998) - musician and artivist
 Shoshana Bean (1995) - stage actress/singer
 John Brotherton (1998) - actor
 Mike Byrne (2008) - musician, drummer for The Smashing Pumpkins
 Ben Crane (1994) - four-time PGA Tour tournament champion
 Ryan Deckert (1989) - formerly represented District 8 in the Oregon House of Representatives
 James FitzPatrick (1982) - professional football player
 Collin Hegna (1996) - musician for The Brian Jonestown Massacre
 Dorothy Johnson (1955) - film actress
 Steve Lyons (1978) - former Major League Baseball player and current announcer for the Boston Red Sox
 Anthony Newman (1984) - NFL safety
 Meredith Phillips (1991) - television personality/contestant on ABC reality television series The Bachelorette
 Jordan Senn (2003) - professional football player for the Carolina Panthers in the National Football League
 Ari Shapiro (1996) - radio journalist for NPR
 Jordan Railey (2010) - basketball player
 Scott Shleifer (1995) - billionaire hedge fund manager
 Todd Snider (1985) - singer-songwriter
 Anthony Taylor (1984) - basketball player
 Mac Wilkins (1968) - gold medalist in the 1976 Summer Olympics in the discus throw; silver medalist in the 1984 Summer Olympics in the discus throw 
 Elsie Windes (2003) - gold medalist in the 2012 Summer Olympics for women's water polo; silver medalist in the 2008 Summer Olympics for women's water polo  
 Carolyn Wood (1963) - gold medalist in the 1960 Summer Olympics in the 4 x 100 freestyle relay
 Jamey Harris (1989) - National Champion 1998 U.S. Track & Field,  men's 1500 meters.

References

External links
 website

High schools in Washington County, Oregon
Education in Beaverton, Oregon
Educational institutions established in 1902
Buildings and structures in Beaverton, Oregon
Public high schools in Oregon
1902 establishments in Oregon
Beaverton School District